Kalaleh-ye Olya (also Romanized as Kalāleh-ye ‘Olyā and Kalaleh Olya; also known as Kalāleh-ye Bālā) is a village in Minjavan-e Gharbi Rural District, Minjavan District, Khoda Afarin County, East Azerbaijan Province, Iran. At the 2006 census, its population was 198, in 43 families.

References 

Populated places in Khoda Afarin County